Re is the second studio album by Mexican rock band Café Tacuba, released in 1994. The album has been called "the equivalent of The Beatles' White Album for the rock en español movement" by The New York Times. In 2012, Rolling Stone ranked it at number one on its list of "The 10 Greatest Latin Rock Albums of All Time".

Legacy
Re album established Café Tacuba's style of genre-switching, which had not been as prominent on their debut album Café Tacuba, released two years earlier. Its sheer length – an hour long – and experimentation with musical styles have made it a favorite among fans. One notable aspect of the album is that it contains several musical genres, notably norteño, huapango, banda, and bolero.

Colombian rock band Aterciopelados performed a song entitled "Re" as a homage to the band and the album on their 2016 live album Reluciente, Rechinante y Aterciopelado.

Re had sold 125,000 units in Mexico, 15,000 in Chile and 50,000 in the United States.

Track listing

Personnel

Band members
 Cosme (Rubén Albarrán) – lead vocals
 Emmanuel del Real – keyboards, acoustic guitar, piano, programming, drum machine,  backing vocals, lead vocals, melodeon
 Joselo Rangel – electric guitar, acoustic guitar, jarana, backing vocals
 Quique Rangel – bass guitar, electric upright bass, guitarron, backing vocals

Art
 Sergio Toporek
 Rubén Albarrán

References

Café Tacuba albums
1994 albums
Albums produced by Gustavo Santaolalla